Marquette was a federal electoral district in Manitoba, Canada, that was represented in the House of Commons of Canada from 1871 to 1979.

This riding was created in 1871 following the creation of the province of Manitoba in 1870.

It was abolished in 1976 when it was redistributed into Brandon—Souris, Dauphin and Portage—Marquette  ridings.

Election results

By-election: As a result of Manitoba joining Confederation, 15 July 1870

double member constituency in 1871

By-election: During trial of election petition, 25 August 1874 Ryan was declared the sitting member, as a result of the scrutiny of votes.

By-election: On Mr. Macdonald being appointed Prime Minister of Canada, 16 October 1878. Macdonald chose to run in another riding in his ministerial by-election.

By-election: On Mr. Watson's resignation

By-election: On Mr. Roche being appointed Secretary of State for Canada, 10 October 1911

By-election: On Mr. Glen's resignation, 4 November 1948

See also 

 List of Canadian federal electoral districts
 Past Canadian electoral districts

External links 

Former federal electoral districts of Manitoba